Interactive Brokers LLC (IB) is an American multinational brokerage firm. It operates the largest electronic trading platform in the U.S. by number of daily average revenue trades. The company brokers stocks, options, futures, EFPs, futures options, forex, bonds, funds, and some cryptocurrencies.

The company is headquartered in Greenwich, Connecticut and has offices in four cities. It is the largest subsidiary of the brokerage group Interactive Brokers Group, Inc., which was founded by Chairman Thomas Peterffy, an early innovator in computer-assisted trading. IB is regulated by the U.S. Securities and Exchange Commission, the Financial Industry Regulatory Authority, the New York Stock Exchange, the Commodity Futures Trading Commission, National Futures Association, Chicago Mercantile Exchange and other self-regulatory organizations. The company is a provider of fully disclosed, omnibus, and non-disclosed broker accounts and provides correspondent clearing services to 200 introducing brokers worldwide, as of 2014. , the company serves 1.76 million customers, with US$348.5 billion in customer equity. Interactive Brokers Group owned 40 percent of the now-closed futures exchange OneChicago, and it is an equity partner and founder of the Boston Options Exchange.

The original organization was first created as a market maker in 1977 under the name T.P. & Co., and was renamed Timber Hill Inc. in 1982. It became the first to use fair value pricing sheets on an exchange trading floor in 1979, and the first to use handheld computers for trading, in 1983. In 1987, Peterffy also created the first fully automated algorithmic trading system, to automatically create and submit orders to a market. Between 1993 and 1994, the corporate group Interactive Brokers Group was created, and the subsidiary Interactive Brokers LLC was created to control its electronic brokerage, and to keep it separate from Timber Hill, which conducts market making. In 2014, Interactive Brokers became the first online broker to offer direct access to IEX, a private forum for trading securities. , about 23.5 percent of the company is publicly held, while the remainder is held by employees and their affiliates; Thomas Peterffy is the largest shareholder.

History

In 1977, Thomas Peterffy left his job designing commodity trading software for Mocatta Metals, and bought a seat on the American Stock Exchange (AMEX) as an individual market maker. The following year, he formed his first company, named T.P. & Co., to expand trading activities to several members under badge number 549. At the time, trading used an open outcry system; Peterffy developed algorithms to determine the best prices for options and used those on the trading floor, and thus the firm became the first to use daily printed fair value pricing sheets. In 1979, the company expanded to employ four traders, three of whom were AMEX members. In 1982, Peterffy renamed T.P. & Co. to Timber Hill Inc.; he named it after a road to a favorite retreat, one of his properties on Hutchin Hill Road in Woodstock, New York. By 1983, Peterffy was sending orders to the floor from his upstairs office; he devised a system to read the data from a Quotron machine by measuring the electric pulses in the wire and decoding them. The data would be then sent through Peterffy's trading algorithms, and then Peterffy would call down the trades. After pressure to become a true market maker and keep constant bids and offers, Peterffy knew that he would need his employees to closely pay attention to market movements, and that handheld computers would help. At the time, the AMEX didn't permit computers on the trading floor. Because of this, Peterffy had an assistant deliver market information from his office in the World Trade Center. In November 1983 he convinced the exchange to allow computer use on the floor.

In 1983, Peterffy sought to computerize the options market, and he first targeted the Chicago Board Options Exchange (CBOE). At the time, brokers still used fair value pricing sheets, which were by then updated once or twice a day. In 1983, Timber Hill created the first handheld computers used for trading. As Peterffy explained in a 2016 interview, the battery-powered units had touch screens for the user to input a stock price and it would produce the recommended option prices, and it also tracked positions and continually repriced options on stocks. However, he immediately encountered opposition from the heads of the exchange. When he made the device smaller, the committee stated that no analytic devices were allowed to be used on the exchange floor. Effectively blocked from using the CBOE, he sought to use his devices in other exchanges.

Also in 1983, Timber Hill expanded to 12 employees and began trading on the Philadelphia Stock Exchange. In 1984, Timber Hill began coding a computerized stock index futures and options trading system and, in February 1985, Timber Hill's system and network was brought online. The system was designed to centrally price and manage risk on a portfolio of equity derivatives traded in multiple locations around the country. In 1985, Peterffy introduced his computer system to the New York Stock Exchange (NYSE), which allowed it. However, the stock exchange only allowed it to be used at trading booths several yards away from where transactions were executed. Peterffy responded by designing a code system for his traders to read colored bars emitted in patterns from the video displays of computers in the booths. This caused the exchange and other members to be suspicious of insider trading, which convinced Timber Hill to distribute instructions throughout the exchange, describing how to read the displays. In response, the exchange required the company to turn the screens away from the trading floor, which prompted Peterffy to hire a clerk to communicate with the traders via hand signals. Eventually computers were allowed on the trading floor.

Timber Hill joined the Options Clearing Corporation in 1984, the New York Futures Exchange in 1985, and the Pacific Stock Exchange and the options division of the NYSE the following year. Also in 1985, the firm joined and began trading on the Chicago Mercantile Exchange, the Chicago Board of Trade and the Chicago Board Options Exchange. In 1986, the company moved its headquarters to the World Trade Center to control activity at multiple exchanges. Peterffy again hired workers to sprint from his offices to the exchanges with updated handheld devices, which he later superseded with phone lines carrying data to computers at the exchanges. Peterffy later built miniature radio transmitters into the handhelds and the exchange computers to allow data to automatically flow to them.

In 1987, Timber Hill joined the National Securities Clearing Corporation and the Depository Trust Company (now merged as the Depository Trust & Clearing Corporation). By 1987, Timber Hill had 67 employees and had become self-clearing in equities. In 1987, the CBOE was about to close down its S&P 500 options market due to the options not attracting sufficient trader interest. Because of this, Peterffy pledged that Timber Hill would make tight markets in the product for a year if the exchange would allow the traders to use handheld computers on the trading floor. The exchange agreed, and more traders were attracted by the change in pricing; today S&P 500 options are the most actively traded index options in the U.S. In 1990, Timber Hill Deutschland GmbH was incorporated in Germany, and shortly thereafter began trading equity derivatives at the Deutsche Terminbörse (DTB), marking the first time that Timber Hill used one of its trading systems on a fully automated exchange. In 1992, Timber Hill began trading at the Swiss Options and Financial Futures Exchange, which merged with DTB in 1998 to become Eurex. At that time, Timber Hill had 142 employees.

While Peterffy was trading on the Nasdaq in 1987, he created the first fully automated algorithmic trading system. It consisted of an IBM computer that would pull data from a Nasdaq terminal connected to it and carry out trades on a fully automated basis. The machine, for which Peterffy wrote the software, worked faster than a trader could. Upon inspection, the Nasdaq banned direct interface with the terminal, and required trades to be typed in manually. Peterffy and his team designed a system with a camera to read the terminal, a computer to decode the visual data, and mechanical fingers to type in the trade orders, which was then accepted by the Nasdaq.

1993 to 2000
Interactive Brokers Inc. was incorporated in 1993 as a U.S. broker-dealer, to provide technology developed by Timber Hill for electronic network and trade execution services to customers.

In 1994, Timber Hill Europe began trading at the European Options Exchange, the OM Exchange and the London International Financial Futures and Options Exchange. Also in 1994, Timber Hill Deutschland became a member of the Belgium Futures and Options Exchange, IB became a member of the New York Stock Exchange, and the Timber Hill Group LLC was formed as a holding company of Timber Hill and IB's operations.

In 1995, Timber Hill France S.A. was incorporated and began making markets at the Marché des Options Négociables de Paris (a subsidiary of Euronext Paris) and the Marché à Terme International de France futures exchange. Also in 1995, Timber Hill Hong Kong began market making at the Hong Kong Futures Exchange and IB created its primary trading platform Trader Workstation and executed its first trades for public customers.

In 1996, Timber Hill Securities Hong Kong Limited was incorporated and began trading at the Hong Kong Stock Exchange.

In 1997, Timber Hill Australia Pty Limited was incorporated in Australia, and Timber Hill Europe began trading in Norway and became a member of the Austrian Derivatives Exchange. By 1997, Timber Hill had 284 employees.

In 1998, Timber Hill Canada Company was formed, and IB began to clear online trades for retail customers connected directly to Globex to trade S&P futures.

In 1999, IB introduced a smart order routing linkage for multiple-listed equity options and began to clear trades for its customer stocks and equity derivatives trades. Also in 1999, Goldman Sachs attempted to purchase the company and was turned away.

In 2000, Interactive Brokers (U.K.) Limited was formed and Timber Hill became a Primary Market Maker on the International Securities Exchange (ISE).

2001 to present

In 2001, the corporate name of the Timber Hill Group LLC was changed to Interactive Brokers Group LLC, which at the time handled 200,000 trades per day.

In 2002, Interactive Brokers, along with the Bourse de Montréal and the Boston Stock Exchange, created the Boston Options Exchange. Also in 2002, IB introduced Mobile Trader and an application programming interface for customers and developers to integrate their mobile phone systems with the IB trading system. Also in 2002, Timber Hill became the major market maker for the newly introduced U.S. single-stock futures.

In 2003, Interactive Brokers expanded its trade execution and clearing services to include Belgian index options and futures, Canadian stocks, equity/index options and futures, Dutch index options and futures, German equity options, Italian index options and futures, Japanese index options and futures, and U.K. equity options. In 2004, IB introduced direct market access to its customers on the Frankfurt and Stuttgart exchanges. In the same year, IB upgraded its account management system and Trader Workstation, adding real-time charts, scanners, fundamental analytics, and tools BookTrader and OptionTrader to the platform.

In 2005, IB released its forex trading platform IdealPro (now Ideal FX).

In 2006, the IB Options Intelligence Report was launched to report on unusual concentrations of trading interests and changing levels of uncertainty in the option markets. Also in that year, IBG took stakes in OneChicago, the ISE Stock Exchange, and the CBOE Stock Exchange. In 2006, Interactive Brokers started offering penny-priced options.

On May 3, 2007, IBG held its initial public offering (IPO) through the Nasdaq and sold 40 million shares at $30.01 ($ in ) per share. It was run as a Dutch auction handled by WR Hambrecht (which handled Google's IPO similarly in 2004) and HSBC; it was the second-largest U.S. IPO that year and the largest brokerage IPO since 2005. The shares sold represented approximately 10 percent of the interest in IBG LLC. Also in 2007, a real-time Portfolio Margin platform was introduced for customers trading multiple asset classes, providing increased leverage with real-time risk management; as well, the company introduced exchanges for physicals for customers to exchange stocks and futures with a market-determined rate.

In 2008, the company released Risk Navigator, a real-time market risk management platform. Also in 2008, several trading algorithms were introduced to the Trader Workstation. Among these is the Accumulate-Distribute Algo, which allows traders to divide large orders into small non-uniform increments and release them at random intervals over time to achieve better prices for large volume orders.

In 2009, IB launched iTWS, a mobile trading app based on IB's Trader Workstation; it also released the Portfolio Analyst tool.

In 2011, the company introduced several new services, including the Interactive Brokers Information System, Hedge Fund Capital Introduction Program, and the Stock Yield Enhancement Program. Interactive Brokers also became in 2011 the largest online U.S. broker as measured by daily average revenue trades. During the Occupy Wall Street protests of 2011–2012, IB ran a series of television commercials with the catchphrase "Join the 1%", which were seen as a controversial criticism of the protests.

In 2012, IB began offering money manager accounts and opened the fully electronic Money Manager Marketplace. IB also released the TWS Mosaic trading interface and the Tax Optimizer for managing capital gains and losses.

In 2013, IB released the Probability Lab tool and Traders' Insight, a service that provides daily commentary by Interactive Brokers traders and third party contributors. Also in 2013, IB integrated its trading notification tool (called IB FYI) into the TWS. The tool keeps customers informed of upcoming announcements that could impact their account, and a customer can set it to automatically act to exercise options early if the action is projected to be beneficial for the customer. An IB FYI also can act to automatically suspend a customer's orders before the announcement of major economic events that influence the market.

On April 3, 2014, Interactive Brokers became the first online broker to offer direct access to IEX, a private electronic communication network for trading securities, which was subsequently registered as an exchange.

In 2015, IB created the service Investors' Marketplace, which allows customers to find investors and other service providers in the financial industry. IB also gained clients through Scottrade that year; Scottrade had previously offered complex option trading through its platform OptionsFirst, and began offering trading through IB's platform.

In March 2016, IB released a companion app to iTWS for the Apple Watch.

In May 2017, IB announced the sale of the market making business conducted by its Timber Hill subsidiary, including its market making software, to New York-based Two Sigma Securities.

Milan Galik was appointed chief executive officer of Interactive Brokers Group in 2019, succeeding founder Thomas Peterffy, who remained as chairman of the board.

In 2019, IB launched the low-cost account offering "IBKR Lite" and fractional share trading.

In 2020, the customer base grew to one million users. During the GameStop short squeeze, Interactive Brokers briefly restricted trading of several stocks, along with other brokerages.

In 2021, the company announced that users would be able to trade cryptocurrencies such as Bitcoin and Ethereum. The company charges commissions of 0.12 to 0.18% of the traded amount.

Operations

Interactive Brokers is the largest electronic brokerage firm in the US by number of daily average revenue trades, and is the leading forex broker. Interactive Brokers also targets commodity trading advisors, making it the fifth-largest prime broker servicing them. IB is regulated by the Securities and Exchange Commission, the Financial Industry Regulatory Authority, the New York Stock Exchange, the Financial Conduct Authority and other regulators and self-regulatory organizations. It provides correspondent clearing services to 200 introducing brokers worldwide, as of 2014. , the company serves 1.68 million client brokerage accounts, with $373.8 billion in customer equity. , about 23.5 percent of the company is publicly held, while the remainder is held by employees; Thomas Peterffy is the largest shareholder.

Peterffy has described the company as similar to Charles Schwab Corporation or TD Ameritrade, however, specializing in providing brokerage services to larger customers and charging low transaction costs. He also described the company's focus on building technology over having high sales, with technology often used to automate systems in order to service customers at a low cost. The company can afford to focus on automation and acquiring customers over focusing on financial results, as 76.5% of the company is held by employees. It has offered direct market access to Australian contracts for difference since 2008. , mobile transactions accounted for about 10% of the company's retail orders. Investors can open accounts online without a minimum deposit requirement, and IBKR does not charge inactivity fees. New customers are directed towards IBKR Campus, the company's education resource repository.

Employees
Interactive Brokers Group has 11 directors, including Thomas Peterffy, chairman of the board of directors, who as the controlling shareholder is able to elect board members. As of 2016, the company has 1,649 employees, and 1,365 of them hold company stock. Interactive Brokers employs computer programmers and IT workers; programmers outnumber other employees five to one. As of 2015, approximately nine percent of employees work in legal or regulatory compliance departments.

Among the company's directors are Lawrence E. Harris, a professor at the University of Southern California's Marshall School of Business, and who was chief economist of the Securities and Exchange Commission. Among its former directors are Hans Stoll, founder and director of the Financial Markets Research Center at Vanderbilt University, and an author and former president of the American Finance Association, and Ivers Riley, former chairman of the International Securities Exchange, CEO of the Hong Kong Futures Exchange, and chief developer of SPDR funds.

Locations
Interactive Brokers maintains a  headquarters in downtown Greenwich, Connecticut. Traders and programmers work in units with several monitors and more overhead, while several network engineers staff an area round the clock, six days a week. The company also has offices in Budapest, Chicago, Dublin, Hong Kong, London, Luxembourg, Montreal, Mumbai, San Francisco, Singapore, Sydney, Tokyo, Toronto, West Palm Beach, Ft. Lauderdale and Zug. More than half of the company's customers reside outside the United States, in approximately 200 countries.

Media
The first chapter of Christopher Steiner's 2012 book Automate This: How Algorithms Came to Rule Our World describes Thomas Peterffy's development of Interactive Brokers and the technologies that have led to the modern automated market. Four chapters of Scott Patterson's Dark Pools: The Rise of the Machine Traders and the Rigging of the U.S. Stock Market also detail Peterffy and his company.

See also

 Financial innovation

Notes

References

External links

 

1978 establishments in New York (state)
American companies established in 1978
Companies based in Greenwich, Connecticut
Financial services companies established in 1978
Financial derivative trading companies
Financial services companies of the United States
Investment management companies of the United States
Multinational companies headquartered in the United States
Online brokerages
Electronic trading platforms
Online financial services companies of the United States
2007 initial public offerings